Lödöse Varv AB is a Swedish shipbuilder located in Lödöse, Sweden. Its ships include , captured by Somali pirates in 2008, as well as OT Rederierna (now sailing as Marabou), the tanker Akleja, the chemical tanker Professor K Bohdanowicz, MF Strada Corsara, and MS Vallann.

References

Västergötland
Västra Götaland County
Shipyards of Sweden